Shelton Johnson (born 1958 in Detroit, Michigan) is a park ranger with the U.S. National Park Service, and works in Yosemite National Park. As of 2023  he had worked in Yosemite for 30 years of his 37-year career.

Johnson began his career in Yellowstone National Park in 1987. He had numerous appearances in the Ken Burns documentary miniseries The National Parks: America's Best Idea, broadcast on PBS September 27 to October 2, 2009, and was called the "unexpected star" of the film. Johnson attended a preview of the film at the White House that day, where he discussed the documentary with President Barack Obama.

Background
Johnson was born in Detroit in 1958. He is of African-American and Native American ancestry. While living in Germany, where his father was stationed in the Army, Shelton, at five years of age, went on a family vacation to the Berchtesgaden area in Germany's Bavarian Alps, which later became the Berchtesgaden National Park. He describes this visit as influential in developing his awe for mountains and the sky. His family also visited the Black Forest.

Johnson graduated from Cass Technical High School in 1976. He attended college at the University of Michigan, where he graduated with a B.A. degree in English literature in 1981. He next served with the Peace Corps as an English teacher in Liberia. He later returned to the University of Michigan to do graduate study in poetry before going to work for the National Park Service.

Work
Johnson is an advocate for bringing minorities, particularly African-Americans, to the National Parks and connecting them to the natural world. He believes that "one of the great losses to African culture from slavery was the loss of kinship with the earth". He dedicated his work to this issue when he found the history of Buffalo Soldiers, the African-American regiments of the historically segregated U.S. Army. Johnson is now known for his research and publications on the assignments of the 24th Infantry Regiment and the 9th Cavalry Regiment to protect the new National Parks in California's Sierra Nevada. He created a website called Shadow Soldiers around a fictive letter to the Buffalo Soldiers at the parks, and wrote and maintains a segment on the Buffalo Soldiers on Yosemite National Park's official website. He wrote and performs a living history performance called Yosemite Through the Eyes of a Buffalo Soldier, 1904, which is presented as an interpretive program at the park and at locations around the country. In 2009, Johnson received the National Freeman Tilden Award as the best interpreting ranger in the National Park Service for his work with Ken Burns and Dayton Duncan on their national park film.

In 2010, he invited Oprah Winfrey to visit the parks as an icon of the African-American community, in order to spread "the word that the national parks really are America's best idea, and that this beauty belongs to every American, including African-Americans".<ref>huffingtonpost.com: Diversity in our national parks, November 5, 2010</ref> In October 2010, she spent two days and a night camping in Yosemite National Park and dedicated two of her shows to the National Parks.Oprah.com: Oprah and Gayle Go to Yosemite, October 29, 2010 In 2010, Johnson was the recipient of Clemson University's William C. Everhart Award "for sustained achievements in interpretation that have illuminated, created insights to, and fostered an appreciation of our cultural and historical heritage."

Johnson is the author of the historical novel Gloryland, published by Sierra Club Books in 2009. The book is a fictional memoir of a black Indian from South Carolina who becomes a Buffalo Soldier assigned to patrol Yosemite in 1903.

When asked why he does not seek a promotion and thus higher pay, Johnson was quoted as saying, "I facilitate astonishment. I didn't join the Park Service for money; I get paid in gasps."

Literature
 Shelton Johnson: Gloryland''. Sierra Club Books, San Francisco, 2009,

Awards
1981 Major Hopwood Award in Poetry, University of Michigan, Ann Arbor, MI.
2002 Pacific West Region Freeman Tilden Award, National Parks Conservation Association.
2006 Honorary Kentucky Colonel, commission awarded by Ernie Fletcher, the Governor of Kentucky.
2009 Pacific West Region Freeman Tilden Award, National Parks Conservation Association.
2009 National Freeman Tilden Award, National Parks Conservation Association.
2010 Joined the Studio Audience in Chicago as an invited guest of "The Oprah Winfrey Show".
2010 William C. Everhart Award, Clemson University.
2011 George B. Hartzog, Jr. Award, Coalition of National Park Service Retirees.
2011 Environmental Leadership Award, Ecology Law Quarterly, University of California, Berkeley.
2012 Robin W. Winks Award, National Parks Conservation Association.
2013 Stewart L. Udall Award, Western National Parks Association.
2013 Legacy Leadership Award, The African American Experience Fund of the National Park Foundation.
2015 Superior Service Award, U.S. Department of the Interior.
2016 Nature's Inspiration Honoree, Committee for Green Foothills, Runnymede Farm, CA.
2017 Outdoor Retailer's List of the Top 25 Most Talented People in the Outdoor Industry, Outdoor Retailer, Salt Lake City, UT.
2017 Served as a member of the Nominating Committee for the Ken Burns American Heritage Prize, American Prairie Reserve.
2021 Received the 2021 Lifetime Achievement Award from Outdoor Afro
2022 Received the 2022 American Park Experience Award from the National Park Trust.

References

1958 births
Living people
Reenactment of the late modern period
American historical novelists
University of Michigan College of Literature, Science, and the Arts alumni
National Park Service personnel
Peace Corps volunteers
Writers from Detroit
American male novelists
21st-century American novelists
21st-century American male writers
Novelists from Michigan